Dudley Marvin (May 9, 1786 – June 25, 1856) was a U.S. Representative from New York.

Born in Lyme, Connecticut, Marvin attended Colchester (Connecticut) Academy.
He moved to Canandaigua, New York, in 1807 and studied law.
He was admitted to the bar in 1811 and commenced practice in Erie, Pennsylvania.
He returned to Canandaigua the same year and continued the practice of law.
He served as lieutenant in the state militia in 1812.
He was promoted successively to colonel, brigadier general, and major general.

Marvin was elected as an Adams-Clay Democratic-Republican to the Eighteenth Congress and reelected as an Adams candidate to the Nineteenth and Twentieth Congresses (March 4, 1823 – March 3, 1829).
Devoted his time to developing various mechanical improvements, which he patented.
He moved to New York City in 1835 and to Ripley, New York in 1843, and continued the practice of law.

Marvin was elected as a Whig to the Thirtieth Congress (March 4, 1847 – March 3, 1849).
He resumed practice of law in Ripley, New York, where he died June 25, 1856.
He was interred in East Ripley Cemetery.

Sources

1786 births
1856 deaths
New York (state) Whigs
Politicians from Canandaigua, New York
People from Lyme, Connecticut
New York (state) National Republicans
American militia generals
Democratic-Republican Party members of the United States House of Representatives from New York (state)
National Republican Party members of the United States House of Representatives
Whig Party members of the United States House of Representatives
People from Ripley, New York
19th-century American politicians